Pogranichnoye is a rural locality (a selo) in Alyoshnikovskoye Rural Settlement, Zhirnovsky District, Volgograd Oblast, Russia. The population was 93 as of 2010.

Geography 
Pogranichnoye is located in forest steppe of Volga Upland, 59 km northeast of Zhirnovsk (the district's administrative centre) by road. Novinka is the nearest rural locality.

References 

Rural localities in Zhirnovsky District